Eric Klopfer (born October 8, 1970) is a professor and Director of the Scheller Teacher Education Program and the Education Arcade at MIT. Klopfer's research explores how educational technology, games, and computer simulations can be tools for teaching complex systems and developing cognitive and computational thinking skills.  Klopfer and his research group developed StarLogo and App Inventor for Android and other Visual programming language platforms that build on the work of Seymour Papert and Constructionism (learning theory) in education. He is also the principal investigator in the research and development of award-winning games designed for building understanding in science and math, connecting game play with scientific practice, problem-solving, and real-world issues.

In 2014, Klopfer produced a series of four online courses on the edX learning platform, delivering videos, tools, and assignments for participants to create, implement, and evaluate projects in educational technology. Klopfer is co-founder and past president of the non-profit Learning Games Network, co-author of Adventures in Modeling and The More We Know, and the author of Augmented Learning.

He is a triathlete, the husband of Rachel Klopfer, and the father of two children.

References

External links
 Eric Klopfer's profile page

Cornell University alumni
University of Wisconsin–Madison alumni
MIT School of Architecture and Planning faculty
Living people
1970 births
Santa Fe Institute people